Yukimi Daifuku (Japanese:  "snow-viewing daifuku") is a brand of mochi ice cream manufactured by Lotte. It was also released in Japan in October 1981. It consists of a ball of vanilla ice milk wrapped in a thin layer of mochi, or rice cake, bathed in coconut milk. Lotte originally created Watabōshi (Japanese:  "cotton hat or capped with snow"), a bite-size ice cream wrapped in a thin layer of marshmallow in 1980. Marshmallow was quickly replaced by mochi because it was more popular in Japan and the company perfected a technology to keep mochi soft at freezing temperature in 1981.

It comes in three sizes: a carton containing two pieces of ice cream, with a plastic pick for eating it; a "mini yukimi daifuku" box with nine smaller ice creams that contain 9 spoons; and "yukimi daifuku petit three colour box" ( Yukimi Daifuku Puchi San-iro) containing three kinds, a green tea ice cream, a chocolate ice cream, and a vanilla ice cream. Many people favour the Vanilla, known for its sweet taste.

Aside from its regular vanilla flavor, there is also strawberry milk, triple chocolate raw, tokachi azuki, and raw chocolate.

The regular Yukimi daifuku, strawberry milk, and triple chocolate raw comes in a packaging of two pieces (47 mL each). The tokachi azuki and raw chocolate flavour comes in the same packaging as the mini box. They contain nine pieces with 30 mL in each.

In the hanami (cherry blossom viewing) season, a seasonal variety with strawberry ice cream is sold.

Yukimi is a seasonal activity in Japan, similar to hanami, consisting of watching snow falling. The name is a play upon tsukimi daifuku ("moon-viewing daifuku"), the sweets traditionally eaten while viewing the moon.

See also

 Mochi ice cream
 Snow skin mooncake

External links

Lotte product page
Official page 

Ice cream brands
Lotte Corporation
Products introduced in 1981